Pedro Grases (Vilafranca del Penedès, Catalonia, Spain, September 17, 1909 – Caracas, Venezuela, August 15, 2004) was a Venezuelan writer, historian and literary critic. He won the National Prize for Literature in 1993.

See also
 Literature of Venezuela

References

1909 births
2004 deaths
People from Alt Penedès

Spanish emigrants to Venezuela
Venezuelan literary critics
Venezuelan male writers
Venezuelan people of Catalan descent
Death in Caracas